Orlean is a 2015 Russian film directed by Andrey Proshkin, screenplay by Yuri Arabov.

The film participated in the competition program of the XXXVII Moscow International Film Festival. For her starring role, Elena Lyadova was awarded the prize Silver George  for Best Actress.

Plot
The small town of Orlean, located on the shores of the salt lake in the Altai steppe.
In the hospital room where after yet another abortion the local beauty Lidka lies, appears a strange gentleman who identifies himself as Pavlyuchek, executioner. His questions drive Lidka to hysterics and she runs for help to her friend surgeon Rudik. In a changed appearance the clerk appears in the apartment of Rudik, where lies his paralyzed father in a bad condition.

Cast
 Elena Lyadova as Lidka
 Oleg Yagodin as Rudik 
 Vitaly Khaev as Nevolin 
 Viktor Sukhorukov as   Executioner 
 Timofey Tribuntsev as Borya Amaretto 
 Pavel Tabakov as Igor

Criticism
The Hollywood Reporter: In this literature-centric and one hundred percent acting film, given its specific genre, it was easy to fall into the slapstick, as in tartare. But in this lies the director's courage and skill of Andrey Proshkin.
 Afisha: It is difficult to watch this film - just like a human being: there is practically no sense of taste in it, and there are tangible problems with a sense of proportion.
 Ogoniok: Andrey Proshkin's film has a rare, inexplicable quality of appeal to the future (at the same time, we still understand that 99 percent of the rest of today's films are directed to the past or to nothing at all). At the same time the film has a rare charge of positivity. You literally leave the cinema with the feeling that  victory is near.

References

External links
 

2015 films
Russian comedy thriller films
2010s comedy thriller films
2015 comedy films